Tormenta en el paraíso (English: Storm over Paradise) is a telenovela from Televisa produced by Juan Osorio. It premiered on November 12, 2007 on El Canal de las Estrellas and September 7, 2008 on Univision.

Plot 
In 1519, a Mayan priest, Ahzac, discovers that his daughter Ixmy has fallen in love with a white foreigner. He plans to sacrifice her as a gift to the gods, along with items made of gold and a black pearl. Ixmy avoids her fate, and Ahzac curses the black pearl: "Whoever has this pearl in their possession will never be able to know what happiness is!"

In 1987, Eliseo Bravo (Alejandro Tommasi) and Hernán Lazcano (René Strickler) explore the coral reefs of Cozumel and discover the black pearl. When Hernán touches the pearl, Ahzac's curse takes effect. Eliseo's greed leads to Hernán's death, leaving his wife Analy (Eugenia Cauduro) to raise their newborn daughter Aymar alone.

Nineteen years later, Aymar Lazcano (Sara Maldonado) is a beautiful young woman. After her mother is murdered by a jealous suitor when Aymar rejects him, she lives with family friend Pablo Solis (Manuel Ojeda). She meets Nicolás Bravo (Erick Elías), Eliseo's son, and they fall in love.

Avaricious Maura Duran (Mariana Seoane) meets the main characters in the guise of Karina Rosemberg, a rich heiress whose land Eliseo covets. Manipulated by Maura, Eliseo detests Aymar and her relationship with his son and Maura falls in love with Eliseo's oldest son David (José Luis Reséndez).

The real Karina Rosemberg (Íngrid Martz) was crazy because she saw her parents burned alive. She was in the care of an old man who found her wandering. Unfortunately he died and afterwards Aymar took care of her.. Karina had met David and fallen in love with him, despite his drunkenness at the time, but he does not reciprocate her feelings because he is infatuated with Maura. Maura's attempts to separate Aymar and Nicolás include a fake pregnancy (with Nicolás, the alleged father), an attempted murder and the killing of Nicolás' youngest brother, Leonardo.
Sirenita who is the real Karina Rosemberg decides to run away from home because David confesses his love to someone else. She meets a kind women who helps her get over her feelings for David by giving her a makeover and teaching her manners.

At the end of the series, Maura is stung by a swarm of bees and dies of anaphylactic shock. David and Karina and Aymar and Nicolás marry, and both couples are happy – Nicolás and Aymar with their son Hernán Nicolás Jr. and their nephew Leonardo; and Karina and David with their son Elisèo David.

Cast

Main
Sara Maldonado as Aymar Lazcano Mayu
Erick Elías as Nicolás Bravo Andrade
Mariana Seoane as Maura Durán Linares / Karina Rossemberg
Alejandro Tommasi as Eliseo Bravo

Secondary 

Ernesto D'Alessio as Leonardo Bravo Andrade
Manuel Ojeda as Capitán Pablo Solís 
Íngrid Martz as Karina Rossemberg "Sirenita" / Valeria Ross
Aarón Hernán as Padre Augusto 
Frances Ondiviela as María Teresa Andrade de Bravo
Úrsula Prats as Luisa Linares vda. de Durán
Macaria as Paloma Martínez 
Delia Casanova as Micaela Trinidad
Adalberto Parra as Nakuk Kum
Oscar Traven as Mario Abascal
Evelio Arias Ramos as Tacho
Ivonne Ley as Celina Trinidad
Ferdinando Valencia as Lisandro Bravo Martínez 
Arturo Posada as Rigo
Federico Pizarro as Raúl Abascal
Salvador Ibarra as Cirilo
Ricardo Guerra as Cuco
Juan Carlos Serrán as Lucio Trinidad
Maribel Fernández as Carmelita de Trinidad
Pietro Vannucci as Botel 
Vicente Herrera as Aquilino Sánchez 
Patricia Martínez as Donata
Dobrina Cristeva as Cleotilde
Marco Uriel as Dr. Andrés Gutiérrez
José Luis Reséndez as David Bravo
Julio Camejo as José Miguel Díaz Luna
Alejandra Procuna as Martha Valdivia 
Flor Procuna as Rosalinda Díaz Luna
Humberto Elizondo as Lic. Alberti
Anastasia Acosta as Leonor
Vielka Valenzuela as Lic. Méndez
Magda Guzmán as Yolanda
Xavier Ortiz as Emilio
Erika Buenfil as Patsy Sandoval Portillo
Carlos Cámara Jr. as Isaac Rossemberg
Kelchie Arizmendi as Brisa
Mar Contreras as Penélope Montalbán
Lis Vega as Lizesca
Arturo García Tenorio as Gastón

Special participation

René Strickler as Hernán Lazcano 
Eugenia Cauduro as Analy Mayu Vda. de Lazcano
Israel Jaitovich as Roque Durán
Alejandro Ávila as Víctor
Archie Lafranco as Manuel de Molina "Hombre Blanco"
Patricio Cabezut as Barraza
José Carlos Ruiz as Ahzac
Lupita Jones as Herself

References

External links

2007 telenovelas
2007 Mexican television series debuts
2008 Mexican television series endings
Mexican telenovelas
Spanish-language telenovelas
Televisa telenovelas